The 2015 Dubai Tour was a four-stage men's professional road cycling race. It was the second running of the Dubai Tour; it started on 4 February at Dubai International Marine Club and finished on 7 February at the Burj Khalifa. The race was part of the 2015 UCI Asia Tour, and was categorised by the UCI as a 2.HC race.

Teams
Sixteen teams were selected to take part in the race, including 10 World Tour teams:

Race overview
The race was composed of four stages: three were classified as flat stages and one as a medium-mountain stage.

Stages

Stage 1
4 February 2015 — Dubai International Marine Club to Union House Flag,

Stage 2
5 February 2015 — Dubai International Marine Club to Palm Jumeirah,

Stage 3
6 February 2015 — Dubai International Marine Club to Hatta Dam,

Stage 4
7 February 2015 — Dubai International Marine Club to Burj Khalifa,

Classification leadership table
In the 2015 Dubai Tour, four different jerseys were awarded. For the general classification, calculated by adding each cyclist's finishing times on each stage, and allowing time bonuses for the first three finishers at intermediate sprints and at the finish of mass-start stages, the leader received a blue jersey. This classification was considered the most important of the 2015 Dubai Tour, and the winner of the classification was considered the winner of the race.

Additionally, there was a points classification, which awarded a red jersey. In the points classification, cyclists received points for finishing in the top 10 in a stage. For winning a stage, a rider earned 20 points, with 16 for second, 12 for third, 9 for fourth, 7 for fifth, 5 for sixth with a point fewer per place down to a single point for 10th place. Points towards the classification could also be accrued at intermediate sprint points during each stage; these intermediate sprints also offered bonus seconds towards the general classification. There was also a sprints classification for the points awarded at the aforementioned intermediate sprints, where the leadership of which was marked by a jersey in the colours of the United Arab Emirates flag.

The fourth jersey represented the young rider classification, marked by a white jersey. This was decided in the same way as the general classification, but only riders born after 1 January 1990 were eligible to be ranked in the classification. There was also a classification for teams, in which the times of the best three cyclists per team on each stage were added together; the leading team at the end of the race was the team with the lowest total time.

Final standings

General classification
The overall title was taken by Mark Cavendish due to his winning two stages.

References

Sources

External links

2015
Dubai Tour
Dubai Tour